Maltokinase is an enzyme with systematic name ATP:alpha-maltose 1-phosphotransferase. This enzyme catalyses the following chemical reaction

 ATP + maltose  ADP + alpha-maltose 1-phosphate

This enzyme requires Mg2+ for activity.

References

External links 
 

EC 2.7.1